Birgit Radochla (later Birgit Michailoff, born 31 January 1945) is a retired German gymnast. She competed at the 1964 Summer Olympics in all artistic gymnastics events and finished in fourth place with the German team. Individually she won a silver medal in the vault and finished fourth in the floor exercise and all-around. She also won three medals in individual events at the 1965 European championships.

Her father Helmut was a substitute gymnast for the German Olympic team in 1936, and in 1949 became the first champion of East Germany on pommel horse.

After retiring from competitions, she completed her training as a kindergarten teacher at the Fröbel-Institut Berlin-Köpenik in 1971 and then worked as a clerk at her club SC Dynamo Berlin. She later received two more degrees of beautician and sports coach via evening school and distance learning. She married Michail Michailoff, a Bulgarian engineer and researcher in electronics and later also sports journalist.

Eponymous skill
Radochla has one eponymous skill listed in the Code of Points.

References

See also
 

1945 births
Living people
German female artistic gymnasts
Olympic gymnasts of the United Team of Germany
Olympic silver medalists for the United Team of Germany
Olympic medalists in gymnastics
Gymnasts at the 1964 Summer Olympics
Medalists at the 1964 Summer Olympics
Originators of elements in artistic gymnastics